Pesoli is a surname. Notable people with the surname include:

Stefano Pesoli (born 1984), Italian footballer 
Emanuele Pesoli (born 1980), Italian footballer